Danilia textilis is a species of sea snail, a marine gastropod mollusc in the family Chilodontidae.

Description
The height of the shell attains 11 mm.

Distribution
This marine species occurs from the Eastern Cape, South Africa to Mozambique.

References

textilis
Gastropods described in 2012